Raúl Michel Melo da Silva (born 4 November 1989) is a Brazilian professional footballer who plays as a centre-back for Liga I club Universitatea Craiova.

Career

Brazil
Born in Belém, Pará, Silva began his career with hometown club Clube do Remo in the Campeonato Brasileiro Série D. In September 2010, he signed on loan for Série A club Clube Atlético Paranaense until the end of the year.

Silva moved to Sport Recife in 2011, where he played one Série B match. After loans to Arapongas Esporte Clube and Criciúma Esporte Clube, and a passage at Paysandú FC, he signed for top-flight club Figueirense FC for the year 2014.

Marítimo
On 6 January 2015, Silva moved abroad for the first time, signing a 2-year deal with C.S. Marítimo of Portugal. He made his Primeira Liga debut 19 days later in a 1–0 home win over FC Porto. He made three appearances in the Taça da Liga, including the 2–1 final loss to S.L. Benfica on 29 May, in which he was sent off at the start of the second half; he had already been dismissed twice in the league season up to then. He scored twice in the campaign, starting on 15 February in a 4–3 comeback win at F.C. Penafiel.

Silva was sent off three more times in his second season in Madeira, including halfway through the first period of a 1–0 home loss to Funchal rivals C.F. União on 16 January 2016, one of three expulsions for his team in that derby. By the end of the month, he was loaned back to Brazil with Ceará Sporting Club for a full year.

In 2016–17, his last season at Marítimo, Silva scored a career-best seven goals in 29 games as the team came sixth. This included two on 22 April in a 3–0 home win over C.F. Os Belenenses, which earned him the award of Player of the Week.

Braga
On 22 May 2017, Silva signed a five-year deal at S.C. Braga of the same league. That season he kept his goal-scoring prowess scoring six goals in the league and making six assists.

Estoril
On 31 January 2022, Braga agreed a loan deal until the end of the season with G.D. Estoril Praia. He made his debut with the club coming on the 60' minute in a 3-0 loss to Sporting CP having been sent off 4 minutes after debuting.

Honours
Figueirense 
Campeonato Catarinense: 2014
Paysandu
Campeonato Paraense: 2013
Braga
Taça da Liga: 2019–20
Taça de Portugal: 2020–21
Supertaça Cândido de Oliveira runner-up: 2021

References

External links
 

1989 births
Living people
Brazilian footballers
Brazilian expatriate footballers
Clube do Remo players
Club Athletico Paranaense players
Sport Club do Recife players
Criciúma Esporte Clube players
Paysandu Sport Club players
Figueirense FC players
C.S. Marítimo players
Ceará Sporting Club players
S.C. Braga players
G.D. Estoril Praia players
CS Universitatea Craiova players
Primeira Liga players
Campeonato Brasileiro Série B players
Liga I players
Expatriate footballers in Portugal
Brazilian expatriate sportspeople in Portugal
Expatriate footballers in Romania
Brazilian expatriate sportspeople in Romania
Sportspeople from Belém
Association football defenders